is a video game character developed for the 1992 fighting game Art of Fighting from SNK. His name is most often written in kana, although in some games, kanji is used to write parts of his name. In the series, Ryo is a skilled martial artist who practices his  family's fighting style, Kyokugenryu Karate, acting 
as the top disciple, alongside his sister Yuri, his father/sensei Takuma and his best friend Robert Garcia. While Art of Fighting follows Ryo's journey as a warrior to protect those he loves, he is also a regular character in the crossover series The King of Fighters, in which he participates in fighting tournaments. Additionally, he stars in manhua adaptations of several series and appears in the anime original video animation version of Art of Fighting.

SNK created Ryo as an homage to the Street Fighter characters as the staff who produced the first game in the franchise left Capcom to join SNK to produce other games. Ryo's inclusion in The King of Fighters series was decided immediately by the staff as SNK wanted to employ characters from other series they created so they could fight in crossover games. SNK artist Hiroaki Hashimoto was responsible for his alterego Mr. Karate's design as he wanted to create a new design distinctly different from the original. Multiple voice actors have provided their talent during Ryo's different appearances.

Ryo has been well received by gamers; his character has been highly ranked in several popularity polls conducted by journals. Video game publications have praised and criticized Ryo's character. Although Ryo has been criticized for his similarities to the Street Fighter video games' characters, several reviewers have praised his development in several games from SNK such as his introduction in Fatal Fury Special and The King of Fighters. Ryo served as a model for the development of Dan Hibiki, a joke character in the Street Fighter series.

Creation

Origins and influences

Ryo Sakazaki was created as an homage to the Capcom fighting games' characters because during the release of the game some members from the original Street Fighter video game from Capcom moved to SNK. This is further explored in the crossover games SNK had with the Capcom franchises where Ryo often interacts with Ryu from Street Fighter. His character inspired game designer Nobuyuki Kuroki to join SNK and oversee his animations in the third game of the series. He was modeled after American actor Patrick Swayze.

Artist Shinkiro has said he had no problems with designing Ryo because he himself had not been rich. Designing Robert Garcia, who was rich, caused him "trouble". In several games, the Kyokugen style is depicted as a struggling family business, funded almost entirely by prize money earned from KOF and Robert's vast wealth. SNK staff members Youichiro Soeda said that Ryo and Robert's debut was unique to other games based on the company because the story did not focus on fighting tournaments but instead on the duo's quest to save Yuri Sakazaki. Art of Fighting creator Hiroshi Matsumoto has stated that he felt he was appealing to people who did not usually play games by showing the story in the game instead of just media such as magazines and comics.  Ryo's movements were changed across the Art of Fighting series. In the third game, SNK wanted to make his actions look more realistic when performing a technique.

In the planning stage of Fatal Fury Special, another SNK fighting game, Hattori Hanzo of World Heroes was being considered as a hidden boss. However, Hanzo was a character developed by another company. Even though ADK was a subsidiary, the staff decided instead to place Ryo as a hidden character; they found him more interesting as a guest character. Ryo's addition to Fatal Fury: Special was done with the approval of the designer of the first Art of Fighting game who also worked on designing Ryo for this game.

For The King of Fighters '94, along with Robert, developers of the game had problems balancing Ryo with the other characters from the series without removing any of his special moves. However, Ryo was said to be one of the game's strongest characters. The developers added that this game was created with the idea of having Ryo fighting against Terry Bogard, the lead character of the Fatal Fury series. Ever since The King of Fighters '96, Ryo was given a new stance which the staff referred to as neutral since they did not find it superior or inferior to the original one. His shape and colors of his projectile technique, "Torakuken", was altered across The King of Fighters. Though SNK artist Falcoon said that Ryo's characterization between Art of Fighting and The King of Fighters is different, he was unable to explain it.

He earned the nickname,  because of his remarkable use of his fighting style. Ryo's moves were designed to show his strength. His moves leave him open, but the EX version of Tiger Fist does not leave him as open and it allows for easier combos. His Neo Max move, the strongest type of move in the game, has the image of being , so his moves were finalized without difficulty. Director Kei Yamamoto mentions in a blog about how he favors it.

Redesign

In some games, Ryo goes by the nickname of "Mr. Karate". Falcoon says this was a reference to how Ryo manages to defeat his father Takuma Sakazaki and thus became worthy of that title. His Fatal Fury: Wild Ambition design received a favorable response from Falcoon who wanted SNK to use Ryo more in their video games, most notably in crossover games. His Buriki One older persona also received this response especially with older gamers based on Falcoon's illustration of him of his black gi. For such games, SNK regarded Ryo as one of the games' strongest characters. However, due to his lack of ability to aim, the team said that players should be careful when using Ryo. Ryo's redesign in his older persona was created by Hiroaki who oversaw the character designs in Wild Ambition and Buriki One. Hiroaki recalls not liking Ryo's original orange gi and wanted to alter him with his superior's approval. The biggest change was Ryo's clothes, which now featured more black and giving him more facial hair. In the 2016 game The King of Fighters XIV an older version of Ryo was originally supposed to appear but was removed.

According to SNK staff, Ryo is an embodiment of fortitude and vigor that shines even when he is compared to other fighters. His normal costume for the Maximum Impact series is the same as the martial arts uniform he has always worn. The design is the same, but there is a change of mood with respect to his Color F. It is reminiscent of Haohmaru in Samurai Shodown. Regarding his Color G~H, his refined sense is shown through his braided hat, ruler, and mountain ascetic style. For the "Mr. Karate" incarnation of Ryo, his Normal has been given a tengu mask, which is reminiscent of his father Takuma. With his "Another" incarnation there is a stylish change of clothing based on his Wild Ambition look. The color combination of his shirt is standard, but there is also a version just like his "Color E" with a design on his back. Color G appears as a style that brings to mind the clothing of the strong tiger Robert. For Neo Geo Battle Coliseum, Ryo was featured in his older persona "Mr. Karate" but with the title "2nd" as SNK said they wanted to distinguish him in a comical way from Takuma.

Voice actors
Ryo was first voiced by Masaki Usui. Starting in 2016 with The King of Fighters XIV, Usui was replaced by Daiki Takakura who wanted to promote his character's appearances. Takakura believes his role as Ryo is important because the character appeared on multiple generations of consoles and he wanted to keep its traditional style despite having a different voice. For the otome game, The King of Fighters: For Girls, Subaru Kimura voices the character.

Appearances

In video games
In the first Art of Fighting, Ryo's sister, Yuri, is kidnapped by Mr. Big, a local criminal mastermind. With the help of his best friend, Robert Garcia, Ryo manages to confront Mr. Big, leading him to a karate dojo where a man challenges the two to a fight. When Ryo prevails, Yuri appears, telling Ryo to stop, for Mr. Karate is their father. In the second game, Takuma reveals that the crime lord Geese Howard turned him into the assassin Mr. Karate. With the Sakazaki family reunited, they, along with Robert, are focused on exacting their revenge on Geese and providing justice to all the others who were wronged by him. While entering into Geese's tournament, The King of Fighters, Ryo is able to defeat Geese and become the first champion of KOF tournament. However, Geese manages to escape with help from his assistants before Ryo could finish him. In Art of Fighting 3: The Pact of the Warrior, Ryo acts as a supporting character to Robert, where the game is more focused. Ryo reprises his role from Art of Fighting in a slot machine game.

Ryo also appears in Fatal Fury Special, an updated version of Fatal Fury 2. He appears as a hidden opponent at the end of the single-player mode and is playable in the home versions. In the PlayStation version of Fatal Fury: Wild Ambition, Ryo uses the title of "Mr. Karate", as an aged and more powerful Ryo. Although he has appeared in no other unrelated games, he is often referenced indirectly in Garou: Mark of the Wolves, he has his own student, Khushnood Butt.

Ryo is a member of the Art of Fighting Team in The King of Fighters series in his young form from Art of Fighting. Despite multiple changes in the team, Ryo remains a core member of the team including in games without storylines like The King of Fighters 2002 and The King of Fighters Neowave, and The King of Fighters '98. Across the series, Ryo develops a close friendship with former foe, Muay Thai fighter King which his family supports. The spin-offs King of Fighters R-1 and King of Fighters R-2 feature Ryo as part of the South Town Team alongside Terry Bogard and Kim Kaphwan. In the two games for the Game Boy Advance titled EX: Neo Blood and EX2, King takes Robert's place on the Art of Fighting Team in the former, and Yuri in the latter. He also appears in the spin-off The King of Fighters Kyo, in which he helps the main character Kyo Kusanagi find his girlfriend Yuki. The spin-off games KOF: Maximum Impact and Maximum Impact 2 also feature a Ryo as a playable character, with the latter also featuring his "Mr. Karate" version as a hidden character. He is present in the mobile-phone game The King of Fighters All Star and Kimi wa Hero with the latter as his older "Mr. Karate" persona. and in his regular persona in and the otome game King of Fighters for Girls.

Ryo is also a central character in Buriki One, a game for the Hyper Neo Geo 64. In this game, he appears in his older persona and fighting in a grappling tournament, employing regular karate as his fighting style. He appears as the sub-boss in the single-player mode. More recently, in NeoGeo Battle Coliseum, Ryo goes by the name , while his look is the one used for Buriki One. He is also playable in The Rhythm Of Fighters, and The King of Fighters Online. He once again wears this outfit in The King of Fighters '98 Unlimited Match Online. He also stars in the crossover video games SNK vs. Capcom in his classic look. Despite not being playable in SNK Gals' Fighters, he appears in the ending Yuri, as well as SNK Heroines: Tag Team Frenzy. His appearance serves as a Mii costume for Nintendo's fighting game Super Smash Bros. Ultimate and he also appears in the King Of Fighters Stadium stage as a cameo as well as a Spirit.

In other media
Ryo appears in the anime OVA version of Art of Fighting from 1993 on. While looking for a cat, Ryo and Robert witness a murder related to a stolen diamond. After fighting the murdering mobsters, they discover that the top mobster, Mr. Big, has kidnapped Ryo's sister to exchange her for the diamond which he believes to be in the possession of the protagonists. He is voiced by Tetsuya Besho in the Japanese version, and by Alden Crews in the English adaptation. Two mangas based on the Art of Fighting games also follow Ryo and Robert's journey. Ryo also appears in the manhua adaptations from The King of Fighters series, which tell how Ryo participates in the fighting tournaments. Mangas and novels based on KOF also feature Ryo but in a smaller role. In the CGI animated series The King of Fighters: Destiny, Ryo reprises his role from The King of Fighters '94 where they meet and befriend the Esaka Team. During the tournament, Ryo and Robert are possessed by the power of the creature Orochi but are saved by the Esaka members. There is also an episode that shows Ryo saving Yuri from King's forces based on the first Art of Fighting game. He also appears in the manga The King of Fighters: A New Beginning where he faces and defeats newcomer Shun'ei.

Reception
Ryo has been well received by gamers, ranking high on several popularity polls. In Gamests 1997 Heroes Collection, Ryo was voted by the staff's as their 24th favorite character. He shared the spot with Sie Kensou and Toru Kurosawa, a character from the game series Last Bronx. Gamest also placed Ryo at number 24 on their Top 50 Characters of 1994 list. In a 2005 poll compiled by SNK-Playmore USA, he was voted as the fifth fan favorite character with a total of 193 votes. The scene of Ryo Sakazaki in the first Art of Fighting game where he is driving a bike in his fighting clothes became an internet meme to the point merchandise based on it was developed. In 2018, Ryo was voted as the sixth most popular Neo Geo character. Den of Geek listed him as the 70th best King of Fighters character stating that while the Kyokugen cast from the series is appealing, Ryo is the least appealing of all of them as he was the "straight man". As part of an official partnership between SNK and Akiba, Ryo has appeared on an Akiba beer bottle label for one of their craft beers.

Reviewers of video games and others in the media have praised and criticized Ryo's character. Wesley Yin-Poole of Videogamer.com commented that Ryo and Robert are "two double-hard bastards" but complained about "the complete lack of fan service on the disc". GameSpot lamented how Ryo and Robert were the only playable characters from the first Art of Fighting story mode, pointing out the similarities between each other's special moves. A number of critics compared Ryo and Robert to the Street Fighter protagonists. David Simpson of AceGamez also noted the similarities between Ryo and Ken and jokingly commented this could not be avoided. However, William Usher from Cinemablend noted that Ryo and Robert's relationship was unique as they never attempt to kill each other. He also noted Ryo was one of the main characters responsible for the creation of The King of Fighters series, praising his development in the series. Eurogamer reviewer Spanner Spencer mentioned that Ryo "seems to model himself after Ken from SFII" due to the similarities of their designs, whereas Pedro Hernandez of Nintendo World Report still referred to him as "clone" of Ryu to the point that they both have similar names. Despite noting his similarities with Street Fighter characters to the point they considered him a "clone", ScrewAttack still praised Ryo's character in Art of Fighting. Juan E. Hernandez of IGN also compared both Robert and Ryo to Street Fighter and Dragon Ball characters based on their type of fighting techniques. Gaming Excellence found both Ryo and Robert likable characters in the Art of Fighting trilogy alongside those in supporting roles. Niche Gamer referred to Ryo as "stoic and strong" in terms of both personality and skills while contrasting him with both Robert and Yuri because each perform similar techniques as a result of training in the same dojo.

Critics also enjoyed Ryo's inclusion in other fighting games produced by SNK. Simon Wigham of Console Obsession felt that he "planted the seeds for the future KOF series". He also noted that his introduction in Fatal Fury Special was as the "token hard old guy". Greg Kasavin of GameSpot listed his "Haohshokohken" move from Art of Fighting as one of the most influential fireball moves in fighting games' history. Armchair Empire liked Ryo's inclusion in Fatal Fury Special which made the previous original version, Fatal Fury 2, "obsolete". Hobby Consolas noted Ryo's inclusion in Special came as a surprise and that he was fun to play in the game. The same site noted that Ryo once again faced Terry Bogard in The King of Fighters '94 and surprised fans that the game included these two combatants. Den of Geek listed his inclusion in Fatal Fury Special as the fifth best guest character in gaming, calling it the "first real fighting game crossover". Meristation highly praised Ryo's older persona, "Mr. Karate", noting it stands out with SNK gamers and that fans would enjoy to play as him again in NeoGeo Battle Coliseum. DieHard GameFan agreed referring to Mr. Karate as one of the best designed characters presented in the crossover game. Hardcore Gaming regarded Ryo's older persona as one of the main reasons why SNK's spin-off Buriki One is remembered by fans several years after its release.

Akemi's Anime World found the character in the series' original video animation "downright pathetic" despite noting his skilled martial arts. The reviewer also found Ryo's Japanese voice was "kind of flat" noting his English voice was more appealing. AnimeOnDVD.com enjoyed the contrast between Ryo and Robert as both "are like night and day in some respects". Hard Core Gaming felt the short's version of Ryo was unfaithful to SNK's character design calling it "awful". They felt the artwork is "appalling", the fights are "dull" and Ryo ends up chasing a lost cat. The character of Dan Hibiki from the Street Fighter series is deemed to be a parody of Ryo's similarities with Ryu and Ken, but his design is more like Robert's while he is showing mannerisms like those of Yuri Sakazaki. These similarities are addressed in the crossover game SVC Chaos: SNK VS. Capcom with GameSpots Greg Kasavin stating that fans would appreciate the appearances and the interactions between Ryo, Dan and Takuma.

References

Art of Fighting characters
Fatal Fury characters
Fictional Japanese people in video games
Fictional karateka
Fictional male martial artists
Male characters in video games
Fictional martial artists in video games
SNK protagonists
The King of Fighters characters
Video game characters introduced in 1992
Video game mascots